Ankylophorus is an extinct genus of stem-teleost ray-finned fish that lived in what is now France during the Late Jurassic. Its type and only species, Ankylophorus similis, was originally named in 1895 as a species of Pholidophorus, but was moved to a separate genus in 1978.

References 

Prehistoric teleostei
Prehistoric ray-finned fish genera
Late Jurassic fish
Jurassic fish of Europe
Jurassic France
Fossils of France
Fossil taxa described in 1978